AFMC can stand for any of the following names:
 Air Force Materiel Command, a major command of the U.S. Air Force
 Armed Forces Medical College, Dhaka, Bangladesh
 Armed Forces Medical College, Pune, India